Pseudagrion bicoerulans is a species of damselfly in the family Coenagrionidae. It is found in Kenya, Tanzania, and Uganda. Its natural habitats are subtropical or tropical moist montane forests, subtropical or tropical high-altitude grassland, and rivers. It is threatened by habitat loss.

References

Coenagrionidae
Insects described in 1907
Taxonomy articles created by Polbot